Erick James Fedde (born February 25, 1993) is an American professional baseball pitcher for the NC Dinos of the KBO League. He previously played for the Washington Nationals of Major League Baseball (MLB). He played college baseball at UNLV.

Amateur career
Fedde attended Las Vegas High School in Sunrise Manor, Nevada. He was a pitcher and an outfielder. Among his teammates was Bryce Harper, a catcher who would later become the 2010 Major League Baseball draft's top overall pick, as well as Fedde's future Nationals teammate. He was drafted by the San Diego Padres in the 24th round of the 2011 Major League Baseball draft, but did not sign and attended the University of Nevada, Las Vegas (UNLV).

Fedde started 15 games as a freshman in 2012. He finished the year 6–5 with a 3.59 earned run average (ERA) and 66 strikeouts in  innings. As a sophomore in 2013, he again started 15 games, going 7–5 with a 3.92 ERA and 83 strikeouts in  innings. During the summer he pitched for the United States collegiate national team, and briefly played collegiate summer baseball in the Cape Cod Baseball League for the Yarmouth-Dennis Red Sox. In his first start of the 2014 season he struck out a career high 11 batters and allowed only one hit. In May 2014, Fedde underwent Tommy John surgery, ending his season. He finished the season, 8–2 with a 1.76 ERA and 82 strikeouts in  innings.

Professional career

Washington Nationals
Fedde was considered a top prospect for the 2014 Major League Baseball draft, and the Nationals selected him in the first round, 18th overall. He signed with the Nationals on July 18, for $2.51 million. Fedde did not play at all in 2014 due to injury. He spent 2015 with both the Auburn Doubledays and the Hagerstown Suns, where he posted a combined 5–3 record and 3.38 ERA between the two clubs. Fedde began the 2016 season with the Potomac Nationals, and was promoted to the Harrisburg Senators in August. Fedde ended 2016 with an 8–5 record along with a 3.12 ERA.

During the Nationals' 2017 season, with the team struggling with its bullpen during the first half, Fedde was temporarily moved to a relief role. While pitching out of the bullpen, he was promoted from Class-AA Harrisburg to the Class-AAA Syracuse Chiefs on June 13, 2017. After less than a month, Fedde was switched back to starting. The move proved fortuitous for the Nationals, who lost Joe Ross from their rotation in July after he tore his ulnar collateral ligament of the elbow and saw veteran starter Stephen Strasburg lose time due to a nerve impingement in his throwing arm. 

Fedde was promoted to the major leagues to start the first game of a double-header against the Colorado Rockies on July 30, 2017. On August 7, Fedde was optioned back to Syracuse after the return of Gio González from paternity leave. Fedde improved on his 9.39 ERA from the previous year in 2018, pitching to a 5.54 ERA with 46 strikeouts across 50.1 innings of work.

In the 2019 season, Fedde continued his improvement, registering a 4.50 ERA with 41 strikeouts in a career-high 78.0 innings of work. In 2020 he was 2-4 with a 4.29 ERA. He gave up a ball hit off of him with the highest exit velocity of all balls hit off of major league pitchers in the 2020 season, at 121.3 mph by Giancarlo Stanton.

On November 18, 2022, Fedde was non tendered and became a free agent.

NC Dinos
On December 20, 2022, Fedde signed with the NC Dinos of the KBO League.

References

External links

UNLV Rebels bio
Fast-working Fedde setting standard for UNLV
Champions on the rise

1993 births
Living people
Sportspeople from the Las Vegas Valley
Baseball players from Nevada
Major League Baseball pitchers
Washington Nationals players
UNLV Rebels baseball players
Auburn Doubledays players
Hagerstown Suns players
Potomac Nationals players
Harrisburg Senators players
Syracuse Chiefs players
Fresno Grizzlies players
Yarmouth–Dennis Red Sox players
Las Vegas High School alumni